Toby William Gray (born 16 October 2001) is an Australian cricketer, who plays for the New South Wales cricket team in Sheffield Shield. He made his first-class debut on 22 November 2022, for New South Wales in the 2022–23 Sheffield Shield season. He marked his debut by picking up three wickets. He is a talented leg spinner, who was named in the Sydney Thunder's squad as a replacement player for the 2022–23 Big Bash League season following his impressive Sheffield Shield debut.

References

External links 
 
 

2001 births
Living people
Australian cricketers
New South Wales cricketers